Sülstorf is a municipality in the Ludwigslust-Parchim district, in Mecklenburg-Vorpommern, Germany.

Sülstorf includes the centers of Boldela and Sülte.

References

Ludwigslust-Parchim